Jesús Posada Moreno (born 4 April 1945) is the former President of the Congress of Deputies, the lower house of the Spanish Cortes Generales. He has worked as a civil engineer and economist.

From 1979 to 1981 he served as civil governor of the province of Huelva in Andalusia.

He went on to represent Soria in the regional parliament of Castile and Leon from 1983. From 1989 to 1991 he was president of the regional government. He has represented Soria Province in the Congress of Deputies since the election of the fifth legislature on 29 June 1993. He succeeded José Antonio de Miguel Nieto. In the government of José María Aznar, he was Minister of Agriculture, Fisheries and Food from 1999 to 2000, and Minister of Public Administration from 2000 to 2002.

On 13 December 2011 he was elected President of the Congress of Deputies for the tenth legislature, with 202 of a possible 350 votes.

See also
 Académie Belgo-Espagnole d'Histoire

References

People's Party (Spain) politicians
Members of the 5th Congress of Deputies (Spain)
Members of the 6th Congress of Deputies (Spain)
Members of the 7th Congress of Deputies (Spain)
Members of the 8th Congress of Deputies (Spain)
Members of the 9th Congress of Deputies (Spain)
Members of the 10th Congress of Deputies (Spain)
Presidents of the Congress of Deputies (Spain)
Spanish civil engineers
1945 births
Living people
People from Soria
Complutense University of Madrid alumni
Presidents of the Junta of Castile and León
Agriculture ministers of Spain
Government ministers of Castile and León
Members of the 12th Congress of Deputies (Spain)
Members of the 1st Cortes of Castile and León
Members of the 2nd Cortes of Castile and León
Members of the 3rd Cortes of Castile and León